Udalnoye is a rural locality (a selo) in Tabunsky Selsoviet, Tabunsky District, Altai Krai, Russia. The population was 215 as of 2013. There is 1 street.

Geography 
Udalnoye is located 9 km northeast of Tabuny (the district's administrative centre) by road. Zabavnoye is the nearest rural locality.

References 

Rural localities in Tabunsky District